The Gaúcho United Front (also known as the Frente Única, FU) was a coalition of two political parties in the Brazilian state of Rio Grande do Sul which formed shortly after Getúlio Vargas became governor. It was composed of the Riograndese Republican Party, led by Borges de Medeiros, and the Liberator Party, led by Joaquim Francisco de Assis Brasil.

In 1929 it became a member of the larger Liberal Alliance, which supported Vargas over Júlio Prestes in the 1930 presidential election. In 1932  split from the FUG to form the Liberal Republican Party, which became the main enemy of the Front in Sul-Riograndense politics.

Notes

Sources
de Abreu, Luciano Aronne. O Rio Grande Estadonovista: Interventores e Interventorias. Unisinos, São Leopoldo, 2005.
Cortés, Carlos E. Gaúcho Politics in Brazil. University of New Mexico Press, 1974.

Defunct political party alliances in Brazil
Political parties established in 1928
1928 establishments in Brazil
Political parties disestablished in 1932
1932 disestablishments in Brazil